Easther Mayi Kith (born 28 March 1997) is a footballer who plays as a defender for Women's Super League club Reading. Born in Canada, she plays for Cameroon women's national team.

Early life
She began playing soccer at age seven with Royal-Sélect de Beauport.

College career
Mayi Kith attended the West Virginia University in the United States.

Club career
During her college career, Mayi Kith played for Dynamo de Quebec. After that, she joined French club Montpellier HSC on 2 January 2019. She signed with WSL club Reading on 31 January 2023

International career
Quebec-born Mayi Kith represented Canada at the 2013 CONCACAF Women's U-17 Championship and the 2014 FIFA U-17 Women's World Cup. Daughter of Cameroonians, she made the one-time switch to Cameroon in order to play for its women's national team at the 2019 FIFA Women's World Cup. She made her senior debut prior to the competition, on 17 May 2019 in a 0–4 friendly loss to Spain.

References 

1997 births
Living people
Citizens of Cameroon through descent
Cameroonian women's footballers
Women's association football defenders
Cameroon women's international footballers
West Virginia Mountaineers women's soccer players
Division 1 Féminine players
Montpellier HSC (women) players
Cameroonian expatriate women's footballers
Cameroonian expatriate sportspeople in the United States
Expatriate women's soccer players in the United States
Cameroonian expatriate sportspeople in France
Expatriate women's footballers in France
Canadian women's soccer players
Soccer people from Quebec
Sportspeople from Quebec City
Canadian expatriate women's soccer players
Canadian expatriate sportspeople in the United States
Canadian expatriate sportspeople in France
Canadian people of Cameroonian descent
Black Canadian women's soccer players
Francophone Quebec people
Dynamo de Quebec players
Royal-Sélect de Beauport players